Wycombe District  was a local government district in Buckinghamshire in south-central England. Its council was based in the town of High Wycombe. The district was abolished on 31 March 2020 and its area is now administered by the unitary Buckinghamshire Council. It had introduced locality budgets before October 2013.

History
The district's name was drawn from the Barony of Wycombe which was originally given to Thomas Gilbert, in 1171.
The district was formed on 1 April 1974, under the Local Government Act 1972, by the merger of the Municipal Borough of High Wycombe with Marlow Urban District and Wycombe Rural District.

Constituent parts
The Wycombe District Council area comprised:
Towns
High Wycombe
Princes Risborough
Marlow

Civil parishes

There were 28 civil parishes including 2 where a Parish Meeting is held in lieu of a Parish Council.

Sports clubs
High Wycombe is home to Wycombe Wanderers F.C.; within the district's boundaries are the homes of Marlow F.C., Marlow United F.C., Risborough Rangers F.C. and Marlow Rugby Union Football Club.

Council affiliation

Following the local elections in May 2015, the council comprises the following:

Transport
The district was bisected by the M40, with a major junction with the A404 at High Wycombe. The A404 connects Marlow and Wycombe within the district. The main railway line through the district, the Chiltern Main Line has major stations at High Wycombe and Princes Risborough. The Marlow Branch Line and Princes Risborough line also provide commuter services.

References

External links 
 Wycombe District Council website
 

 
Former non-metropolitan districts
Local authorities adjoining the River Thames
Non-metropolitan districts of Buckinghamshire
Districts of England established in 1974
2020 disestablishments in England